Anibare may refer to:
 Anibare District
 Anibare Bay